Marine Aircraft Group 53 (MAG-53) was a United States Marine Corps night fighter training group that was commissioned during World War II.  It was the first night-fighter group in the Marine Corps.  During the course of the war the group trained eight night fighting squadrons and sent seven of them into combat.  The group was decommissioned after the war during the post-war drawdown of forces.

History
Marine Night Fighting Group 53 (MAG(N)-53) was formed on April 1, 1943 at Marine Corps Air Station Cherry Point, North Carolina.  It was the first night fighter group in the Marine Corps and was responsible for the training of all VMF(N) squadrons.  The group trained in Vero Beach, Florida in the spring and summer of 1944 and moved to Marine Corps Air Station Eagle Mountain Lake, Texas in November 1944.  MAG(N)-53 was re-designated Marine Night Fighter Group 53 (MNFG 53) in April 1945.  The group remained in Texas until the end of the war.  

The group moved back to MCAS Cherry Point in February 1946  and changed its name again, this time to Marine Aircraft Group 53 (MAG-53) in November of that year.  The group was decommissioned on May 31, 1947.

See also
 United States Marine Corps Aviation
 List of United States Marine Corps aircraft groups

Notes
This article incorporates text in the public domain from the United States Marine Corps.

References

Bibliography

 

United States Marine Corps aircraft groups